Nordsjön kartano (Finnish), Nordsjö gård (Swedish) is an eastern neighborhood of Helsinki, Finland.

Vuosaari